José António Prudéncio Conde Bargiela (29 October 1957 – 2 June 2005), known as José António, was a Portuguese footballer who played as a central defender.

Club career
José António was born in Cascais. After an unassuming two-year spell at S.L. Benfica, where he also played youth football, he moved to neighbours G.D. Estoril Praia where he established himself as a professional.

In 1983, at the age of 25, José António signed with C.F. Os Belenenses – also in Lisbon – where he would remain in several capacities for the next two decades. In 1989, already as an undisputed starter and captain, he helped the Azuis (Blues) lift the Portuguese Cup after a 2–1 win over Benfica.

José António retired in 1991 at nearly 34, having played 163 games for the club in the Primeira Liga. Two years later, he had a very brief coaching spell with Belenenses as one of three coaches during the season, as the team eventually avoided relegation; from an early age onwards, he developed a baldness condition.

International career
José António only earned three caps for Portugal, but his first and last produced memorable results: on 16 October 1985, 13 days shy of his 28th birthday, he helped the national side achieve a 1–0 win in West Germany for the 1986 FIFA World Cup qualifiers.

In the final stages in Mexico, José António appeared in the first match against England, in another 1–0 success. The competition, however, was tainted with the Saltillo Affair in which the squad was involved, and Portugal eventually crashed out in the group stages, and the player never appeared internationally again.

Death
On 2 June 2005, José António was playing in a pickup game with some friends in Carcavelos, but felt indisposed only a few minutes after its start. Having already left the court, he suddenly collapsed and died; all resuscitation attempts were in vain.

He was only 47 years old, and never married.

Honours
Belenenses
Taça de Portugal: 1988–89

References

External links

 

1957 births
2005 deaths
Sportspeople from Cascais
Portuguese footballers
Association football defenders
Primeira Liga players
Liga Portugal 2 players
S.L. Benfica footballers
G.D. Estoril Praia players
C.F. Os Belenenses players
Portugal youth international footballers
Portugal under-21 international footballers
Portugal international footballers
1986 FIFA World Cup players
Portuguese football managers
Primeira Liga managers
C.F. Os Belenenses managers